General Chapman may refer to:

Augustus A. Chapman (1805–1876), Virginia Militia brigadier general in the American Civil War
Edward Chapman (British Army officer) (1840–1926), British Army general
Frederick Chapman (British Army officer) (1815–1893), British Army general
George Henry Chapman (1832–1882), Union Army brigadier general and brevet major general
John Chapman (Australian Army officer) (1896–1963), Australian Army major general
Leonard F. Chapman Jr. (1913–2000), U.S. Marine Corps general
Stephen Chapman (British Army officer) (1776–1851), British Army lieutenant general

See also
Attorney General Chapman (disambiguation)